Chandraharam is a 1954 Telugu-Tamil bilingual swashbuckler film directed by Kamalakara Kameswara Rao in his debut. It was produced by Nagi Reddy-Chakrapani under the Vijaya Productions banner. It stars N. T. Rama Rao, Savitri and Sriranjani Jr., with music composed by Ghantasala. The film was not commercially successful.

Plot
The events of the film take place in the kingdom of Chandana Desam. Its king was blessed with a baby boy with the boon of Lord Chandra. which he named Chandanraju. Chadan was born with a necklace called Chandraharam and his life is preserved in it. At the age of five, Chandan was sent to Maali (S. V. Ranga Rao) for education and was brought up in the care of Maali. Chandan (N. T. Rama Rao) is obligated to get married lest his life be in danger, hence his parents procure portraits of neighboring princesses. All the while, Chandan has a dream girl and wants to marry her. The king asks Maali to search for such a girl and sends Chandan to tour the country. Chandan's brother-in-law Dhoomekatu (Relangi) is greedy for the kingdom and wants to break the marriage of Chandran so that he will die. He sends Niksheparayudu to follow Chandan. Niksheparayudu sees Chandan's dream girl Gauri (Sriranjani Jr.) in a village. Niksheparayudu cleverly manages Gauri's stepmother and hides Gauri there. Gauri's father disapproves of this proposal and sends away Gauri secretly. Chanchala (Savitri), an angel, loves Chandan but he refuses. She snatches his Chadraharam and says he will be alive only in the night. Chanchala's sister Achala notices Gauri in an unconscious state and takes her to Chandan. Maali performs their marriage. Dhoomketu threatens the king to get him crowned, to which the helpless king agrees. During this time, Niksheparayudu notices Gauri at Maali's house. Maali takes Gauri and hides her inside a temple. Meanwhile, Chanchala gets angry at Chandan as he has left for the palace, so she kills him. Dhoomketu orders to keep Gauri also on the funeral pyre. Finally, Gauri's devotion and willpower brings Chandan back to life. Chanchala is cursed by Lord Indra (R. Nageswara Rao) by stripping her supernatural powers. Dhoomekatu and Niksheparayudu also realize their mistake. Finally, the movie ends on a happy note with the crowning ceremony of Chadanraju.

Cast
N.T. Rama Rao as Prince Chandan
Savitri as Chanchala
Sriranjani Jr. as Gauri
S. V. Ranga Rao as Mali
Relangi as Dhumaketu
R. Nageswara Rao
Padmanabham
Balakrishna
K. V. S. Sarma 
Joga Rao
Suryakantham
Rushyendramani as Maridamma

Music 

Music was composed by Ghantasala. Lyrics were written by Pingali Nagendra Rao. Music released on Audio Company.

Tamil songs
Lyrics by Thanjai N. Ramaiah Dass. Arud Jyothi Daivam is a Thiruvarutpa by Vallalar Ramalinga Swamigal. Playback singers are Ghantasala, N. Lalitha, K. Rani, P. Leela, M. Sathyam and A. P. Komala.

Production
The film was produced by Nagi Reddy and Chakrapani under the banner Vijaya Pictures simultaneously in Telugu and Tamil. This is the directorial debut for Kamalakara Kameswara Rao. The cinematography was by Marcus Bartley. Chakrapani wrote the story while Pingali Nagendra Rao wrote the dialogues and lyrics for the Telugu version.

Thanjai N. Ramaiah Dass wrote the dialogues and lyrics for the Tamil version.

References

External links

 Chandraharam songs at Raaga.com

1950s Telugu-language films
1954 films
Films directed by Kamalakara Kameswara Rao
Films scored by Ghantasala (musician)
1954 directorial debut films
Indian black-and-white films
1950s Tamil-language films
Indian multilingual films